Rykerts Water Aerodrome, formerly , is a defunct aerodrome that was located adjacent to Rykerts, British Columbia, Canada.

The airport was classified as an airport of entry by Nav Canada and was staffed by the Canada Border Services Agency (CBSA). CBSA officers at this airport could handle general aviation aircraft only, with no more than 15 passengers.

References

Defunct seaplane bases in British Columbia
Regional District of Central Kootenay